Abhilashi University (AU) is a private university located in the village Chailchowk, in Mandi district, Himachal Pradesh, India. The university was established in 2015 by the Abhilashi Educational Society through the Abhilashi University (Establishment and Regulation) Act, 2014.

Faculties
The university comprises the following faculties:
 Faculty of Agriculture
 Faculty of Ayurveda
 Faculty of Engineering & Management
 Faculty of Pharmacy
 Faculty of Humanities, Education & Basic Science

Approval
Like all universities in India, AU is recognised by the University Grants Commission (India) (UGC), which has also sent an expert committee and accepted compliance of observations and deficiencies. The Abhilashi Ayurvedic College and Research Institute is approved by the Central Council of Indian Medicine (CCIM). The School of Pharmacy is approved by the Pharmacy Council of India (PCI). The university is also a member of the Association of Indian Universities (AIU).

References

External links

Education in Mandi district
Universities in Himachal Pradesh
Educational institutions established in 2015
2015 establishments in Himachal Pradesh
Private universities in India